Anne Bridget "Biddy" Macfarlane, née Griffith (26 January 1930 – 24 November 2019) was an English lawyer. She was the first female County Court registrar and the first woman and first solicitor to be appointed master of the Court of Protection.

References

1930 births
2019 deaths
English solicitors
English women lawyers
20th-century English lawyers
20th-century English women
20th-century English people